Bank Melli F.C. was an Iranian football club based in Tehran as the Sports subordinate of Bank Melli Iran. The club was famous for having one of the best youth academy's in Iran. The club dissolved in the mid 2000s.

Managers 
 Rajab Faramarzi
 Nayeb Ruiendel
 Rahim Mirakhori
 Ali Doustimehr

References

External links 
Dissolution of Bank Melli F.C. at Navad

Football clubs in Iran
Defunct football clubs in Iran
Sport in Tehran
1948 establishments in Iran